Higinbotham may refer to:

People
 George Higinbotham (1826–1892), politician
 Nathaniel Higinbotham (1830–1911), politician
 Thomas Higinbotham (1819–1880), engineer and civil servant
 William Higinbotham (1910–1994), physicist

Places
 Division of Higinbotham
 Higinbotham Province

See also
 Higginbotham
 Higginbottom